Kalkandere District is a district of the Rize Province of Turkey. Its seat is the town of Kalkandere. Its area is 107 km2, and its population is 13,511 (2021).

Formerly known as Karadere, this is a hilly, forested, rural area of scattered villages, inland from the Black Sea coast. There is little flat land and this is an impoverished area losing its population as they migrate away to jobs in other parts of Turkey or abroad. The local economy depends on growing tea on the hillsides. 90% of the agricultural land is tea plantations and there are tea processing plants in the town Kalkandere. Tea was planted in the 1950s and has brought new life to the area. Other activities include bee-keeping.

Composition
There is one municipality in Kalkandere District:
 Kalkandere

There are 22 villages in Kalkandere District:

 Çağlayan
 Çayırlı
 Dülgerli
 Esendere
 Esentepe
 Fındıklı
 Geçitli
 Hurmalık
 Hüseyinhoca
 Inciköy
 Kayabaşı
 Ormanlı
 Pınarköy
 Seyrantepe
 Soğuksu
 Ünalan
 Yenigeçitli
 Yeniköy
 Yeşilköy
 Yokuşlu
 Yolbaşı
 Yumurtatepe

References

Districts of Rize Province